Movin' On is the second album by Playa Fly released in 1998 on Super Sigg Records. This album made Fly a common name in Southern rap with his hit single, "Nobody Needs Nobody", which still gets radio play today. Bill Chill died shortly before the album's completion. Movin' On sold over 80,000 units.

Singles
"Funk-N-Buck", made originally in 1997, was included in this album. In the chorus after the second verse, they says,
"I live for the funk and I love the funk, I need the funk, so pass me the funk."
The word "funk" is commonly used in the city of Memphis in reference to cocaine and "buck" signifies the intoxicating feeling after using cocaine, the song is basically about drugs abuse. As Fly states in the beginning of the third verse,
"I'm on it night after night, I'm catchin' flight after flight
And Flizy (Fly) landin' ain't happy unless my candy is white
They call it yayo up North and yay for short in the South
I got my peers on that pure, I put the funk in the house."
"Funk-N-Buck" is a favorite of most Playa Fly fans due mainly to the usage of bass in the song, which is not common on most of Fly tracks on his early CDs. It comes only second after "Nobody Needs Nobody".

Track listing 

Playa Fly albums
1998 albums